Delbert K. Smith (November 15, 1862 – June 17, 1905) was an American farmer and politician.

Born in Big Bend, Waukesha County, Wisconsin, Smith went to the public schools and the Rochester Seminary. Smith graduated from the University of Wisconsin and was a farmer in the town of Vernon. From 1895 to 1899, Smith served in the Wisconsin State Assembly. Smith then worked for the Wisconsin Secretary of State and then returned to his farm. In 1904 and 1905, Smith served as chairman of the Vernon Town Board. Smith died at his home, in Vernon, Wisconsin, from consumption.

Notes

1862 births
1905 deaths
People from Big Bend, Waukesha County, Wisconsin
University of Wisconsin–Madison alumni
Farmers from Wisconsin
Mayors of places in Wisconsin
Republican Party members of the Wisconsin State Assembly
People from Vernon, Wisconsin
19th-century American politicians